Jean Bouffechoux (19 January 1881 – 26 October 1937) was a French wrestler. He competed in the lightweight event at the 1912 Summer Olympics.

References

1881 births
1937 deaths
Olympic wrestlers of France
Wrestlers at the 1912 Summer Olympics
French male sport wrestlers
Sportspeople from Nièvre